Ofek Fishler (born 24 August 1996) is an Israeli footballer who plays for Maccabi Ahi Nazareth.

Career
Fishler joined Hapoel Haifa in 2007, playing through the youth teams until 2015. On 14 March 2015, Fishler made his debut on the senior team, against local rivals Maccabi Haifa. Fishler made two further appearances for the senior team later in the season.

Fishler played for the national team in youth levels, appearing in a total of 10 matches.

References

External links
 
 

1996 births
Living people
Israeli Jews
Israeli footballers
Footballers from Haifa
Hapoel Haifa F.C. players
Beitar Tel Aviv Bat Yam F.C. players
Hapoel Nof HaGalil F.C. players
Hapoel Acre F.C. players
Maccabi Ahi Nazareth F.C. players
Hapoel Petah Tikva F.C. players
Israeli Premier League players
Liga Leumit players
Association football central defenders